Ryu Seung-woo (born July 8, 1985 ) is a South Korean pool player. Sueng-woo reached the third round (last 32) of the WPA World championships on three occasions; this included the 2008 WPA World Eight-ball Championship; 2008 WPA World Ten-ball Championship;
and the 2014 WPA World Nine-ball Championship. However, he did not progress past this stage.

References

External links
 Ryu Seung-woo at AZBilliards

South Korean pool players
Living people
1985 births